Sri Alavaimalai Subrayar Murugan Temple is a state temple in Tamil Nadu. It is located in mid way of Alavaimalai in Vennandur block.

References

Murugan temples in Tamil Nadu
Vennandur block